Nikodem Sulik-Sarnowski (August 15, 1893 – January 14, 1954; noms de guerre Jodko, Jod, Karol, and Sarnowski) was an officer of the Russian Imperial Army, and Generał brygady of the Polish Army.

Biography
Born August 15, 1893 in the village of Kamienna Stara near Sokółka, Sulik began his military career in the Russian Army, as the part of Poland where he was born belonged to the Russian Empire. In 1918, he became a member of Samoobrona Grodzienska, a Polish organization for Grodnian self-defence; on January 22, 1919, he was named commandant of the Białystok Rifle Regiment of the 1st Lithuanian–Belarusian Division. Sulik fought in the Polish-Soviet War, and took part in the Żeligowski's Mutiny, which resulted in capturing Wilno in September 1920.

In the 1920s, Sulik served in the Polish Army and was frequently transferred between several infantry divisions. In the period September 1927 - February 1929, he was director of the Central School of the Border Guard. Transferred to Regional Office of Military Preparation in Toruń, he finally ended up in the Border Protection Corps (KOP) units located along eastern border of the Second Polish Republic. He served in the KOP in Stolpce, Baranowicze, and Sarny from October 1937 (see Sarny Fortified Area).

After the Soviet invasion of Eastern Poland on September 17, 1939, Sulik commanded KOP units in several skirmishes with the advancing Red Army troops. He did not give up his weapons after the Battle of Kock, and joined the Polish resistance. In November 1939, he was nominated as deputy to Janysz Galadyk, commandant of Wilno district of the Service for Poland's Victory. On April 13, 1941, Sulik was arrested and subsequently tortured by the NKVD, but he was released just a few months later, under the Sikorski-Mayski Agreement.

Sulik joined the Polish Armed Forces in the East, also called Anders' Army. Sulik, promoted to general in 1944, was commandant of the 5th Eastern Borderlands Infantry Division during the Italian Campaign of 1943 to 1945. On July 23, 1944, he was awarded the Virtuti Militari; he received the Polonia Restituta posthumously.

After the war, Sulik remained in the West, settling in London, where he died on January 14, 1954. He was buried at Brompton Cemetery, and on September 12, 1993, his and his wife's ashes were moved to his native village of Kamienna Stara.

Honours and awards
 Gold Cross of the Virtuti Militari (23 July 1944), previously awarded the Silver Cross
 Commander's Cross of the Order of Polonia Restituta (posthumously 18, January 1954), previously awarded the Knight's Cross
 Cross of Independence with Swords
 Cross of Valour - four times
 Gold Cross of Merit with Swords
 Gold Cross of Merit (3 May 1933)
 Commemorative Medal for War 1918-1921
 Ten Years Regained Independence Medal
 Monte Cassino Commemorative Cross
 Home Army Cross (posthumously, 15 August 1967)

Sources
 Krzysztof Filipow, Generał Nikodem Sulik (Kamienna Stara 1893 - Londyn 1954), Muzeum Wojska w Białymstoku, Białystok 1996, .
 Tadeusz Kryska-Karski i Stanisław Żurakowski, Generałowie Polski Niepodległej, Editions Spotkania, Warszawa 1991, wyd. II uzup. i poprawione, s. 172.
 Rocznik Oficerski 1924, Ministerstwo Spraw Wojskowych, Oddział V Sztabu Generalnego Wojska Polskiego, Warszawa 1924, s. 79, 227, 364.

1893 births
1954 deaths
Russian military personnel of World War I
Polish Army officers
Recipients of the Gold Cross of the Virtuti Militari
Recipients of the Cross of Independence with Swords
Recipients of the Cross of Valour (Poland)
Recipients of the Cross of Merit with Swords (Poland)
Recipients of the Gold Cross of Merit (Poland)
Recipients of the Armia Krajowa Cross
Polish people detained by the NKVD
Polish people of the Polish–Soviet War
Polish military personnel of World War II